Greenwood Academy is an 11–18 state secondary school in Dreghorn, North Ayrshire, Scotland.

History 
The school opened in August 1972, serving the areas of Dreghorn, Springside, Bourtreehill, Broomlands and the outer areas of Irvine, and moved into new buildings in October 2008.

Curriculum 
The school provides tuition in the subjects required by the Curriculum for Excellence, including English, mathematics, sciences, health and well-being, ICT, modern languages, religious and moral education, performance and design. Extra curricular activities include drama, music, chess and a variety of sports.

House system 
The school uses a house system, with each pupil placed in one of seven houses: Annick, Gailes, Montgomery, Overtoun, Perceton, Shewalton and Warrix.

Sports 
The school has two sports halls, a dance studio, a fitness suite, a range of grass pitches and an AstroTurf pitch.  Sports offered include badminton, basketball, dance, fitness training, 5-a-side football, football, gymnastics, handball, hockey, netball, volleyball, cricket, rounders, rugby, short tennis and table tennis.

Notable alumni 
Nicola Sturgeon (former First Minister of Scotland)

Head teachers

References

External links 
 

Secondary schools in North Ayrshire
Educational institutions established in 1972
1972 establishments in Scotland
Irvine, North Ayrshire